The prime minister of the State of Palestine is the head of government of the State of Palestine. The post has been in existence since January 2013, when the Palestinian National Authority was officially renamed into the State of Palestine and replaced the previous position of the prime minister of the Palestinian National Authority.

Term
The prime minister is appointed by the president of the State of Palestine.

List of prime ministers (2013–present)

See also

 Speaker of the Palestinian Legislative Council
 Leaders of Palestinian institutions

Notes

References

External links
 Official Website of the Palestinian Prime Minister's Office (West Bank) 

 
Government ministers of the State of Palestine